Mohammad Paolo Zaman Kermani known as Mohammad Zaman (fl. 1680 – c. 1700), a famous Safavid calligrapher and painter.

Life
He was a native of Kerman, Persia. He received his education in Tabriz. He was sent to Rome under the reign of Shah Abbas II. He returned to Persia as a Catholic Christian with the name Paolo. Because of his conversion to Roman Catholicism he was obliged to escape from Persia to India where he obtained the protection of the Moghul dynasty.

Mohammad Zaman was influenced by Italian painting techniques. However, as Ivanov suggests, Mohammad Zaman studied under a European artist in Isfahan, Persia, and the report of his being sent by Shah Abbas II to study in Italy, where he adopted Roman Catholic Christianity, is no more than a colourful legend.

It is reported that Manucci the famous traveller made the acquaintance of Mohammad Zaman at the court of Aurangzib.

References

Sources

External links

Iranian calligraphers
1700s deaths
Year of birth unknown
17th-century Iranian painters
Converts to Roman Catholicism from Shia Islam
Iranian Roman Catholics
People from Kerman